

Track listing
 "S Car Go"  – 4:09
 "26th Moon" – 5:13
 "N.I.Gel Freestyle" – 1:55
 "Your Mother" – 6:23
 "Madshrapnomuffin" – 3:42
 "Eye of the Storm" – 3:27
 "Lakeshore Phatty" – 5:37
 "Anoxia (+Reprise)" – 7:11

Pocket Dwellers albums
1998 EPs